Hartman Toromba (born 2 November 1984 in Windhoek) is a Namibian football defender who last played for African Stars F.C. in the Namibia Premier League.

He moved to the South African club Free State Stars, having joined the team in 2008 from Black Leopards, who were relegated. Prior to moving to South Africa, he played for Black Africa.

He was a part of the Namibian squad at the 2008 African Cup of Nations.

References

Free State Profile

1984 births
Living people
Footballers from Windhoek
Namibia international footballers
Namibian expatriate sportspeople in South Africa
2008 Africa Cup of Nations players
Black Africa S.C. players
Free State Stars F.C. players
Expatriate soccer players in South Africa
Black Leopards F.C. players
Vasco da Gama (South Africa) players
Association football fullbacks
Namibian men's footballers